Bernice Giduz Schubert (October 6, 1913 – August 14, 2000) was an American botanist. Her academic career developed over 53 years as a professor and herbarium curator with Harvard University.

She made many collection trips in Mexico and the United States.

Early life and education
Bernice Giduz Schubert was born in 1913, in Boston, Massachusetts. She earned an undergraduate degree at the Massachusetts College of Agriculture (1935), and graduate degrees at Radcliffe College (M. A. 1937, Ph.D. 1941).

Career
Dr. Schubert began her professional life working at the Gray Herbarium at Harvard. While there, she served as assistant to Merritt Fernald in compiling his Gray's Manual of Botany (1951) and Edible Wild Plants of Eastern North America (1958). She was awarded a Guggenheim Fellowship in 1949 to work on African plants in Belgium.

Upon returning to America in 1952, Schubert worked for the United States Department of Agriculture, classifying Central American species of possible medical value.  She became associate curator at Arnold Arboretum in 1962, where she was editor of the journal, taught undergraduate and graduate classes, and advised students.  She retired from Harvard in 1984.

Selected publications

 1974. Begoniales. 4 pp.
 1971. To New Species of Desmodium from Africa.
 1955. Alkaloid Hunting. With John James Willaman

Books
 1987. Flora of Veracruz: Dioscoreaceae.
 1966. Aspects of Taxonomy in the Genus Dioscorea.
 1961. Begoniaceae. with Lyman B. Smith.
 1950. A New Begonia Argentinian. with Lyman B. Smith
 1941. Review of the Argentinian species of the gender Begonia. with Lyman B. Smith.

Honors
 1949: Guggenheim Fellowship

References

People from Boston
Botanists with author abbreviations
American women botanists
American botanists
2000 deaths
1913 births
Harvard University faculty
Radcliffe College alumni
20th-century American women
20th-century American people
American women academics